Çemenabat (also known as Çemenebit, Çemenibit or Chemen-i-Bid) is a village in Mary, Tagtabazar District, Turkmenistan. It is the seat of the Çemenabat rural council. The name of the village was officially changed by parliamentary decree on 15 August 2009.

References

Populated places in Mary Region